Cold Blood is the first studio LP album by Cold Blood, originally released in 1969. It was produced for San Francisco Records and distributed by Atlantic Records.

Track listing

Personnel
 Lydia Pense – vocals
 Larry Field – guitar
 Rod Ellicott – bass
 Frank J. Davis – drums
 Raúl Matute – piano, organ
 Jerry Jonutz – alto saxophone, baritone saxophone
 Danny Hull – tenor saxophone
 David Padrón – trumpet
 Larry Jonutz – trumpet
 Carl Leach – additional trumpet
 Mic Gillette – additional trumpet, trombone
Technical
 David Rubinson – producer
 Fred Catero - recording
 Rick Griffin – cover

References

1969 debut albums
Cold Blood (band) albums
albums produced by Dave Rubinson
Atlantic Records albums